Golombek is a surname. People with that name include:

 Andreas Golombek (born 1968), German former footballer and manager
 Bedřich Golombek (1901-1961), Czech journalist and writer
 Diego Golombek (born 1964), Argentine biologist, communicator and popularizer of science
 Fabio Golombek (active from 1983), Brazilian-American film producer and director
 Harry Golombek (1911-1995), British chess grandmaster, chess arbiter, chess author, and wartime codebreaker

See also
 6456 Golombek, see List of minor planets: 6001–7000#456